Mount Gayley is a 13,510-foot-elevation (4,118 meter) mountain summit located one mile east of the crest of the Sierra Nevada mountain range in Inyo County, California, United States. It is situated in the Palisades area of the John Muir Wilderness, on land managed by Inyo National Forest. Mount Gayley ranks as the 59th highest summit in California.

History

The name commemorates Charles Mills Gayley (1858–1932), beloved English professor and Academic Dean of the University of California, Berkeley. This mountain's name was officially adopted prior to 1939 by the U.S. Board on Geographic Names based on a recommendation by the Sierra Club. Mount Sill and nearby Mount Jepson were also named for University of California professors. The first ascent of the summit was made June 10, 1927, by Norman Clyde, who is credited with 130 first ascents, most of which were in the Sierra Nevada.

Climbing
Established climbing routes on Mount Gayley:

 Southwest Ridge (aka Yellow Brick Road) –  – First ascent 1927
 South Face – class 3 – Several possible routes
 West Face – class 3 – FA June 1950 by Robert Cogburn and Ed Robbins

Access from Big Pine: Glacier Lodge Road, North Fork Big Pine Creek Trail, then Glacier Trail.

Climate
According to the Köppen climate classification system, Mount Gayley is located in an alpine climate zone. Most weather fronts originate in the Pacific Ocean, and travel east toward the Sierra Nevada mountains. As fronts approach, they are forced upward by the peaks, causing them to drop their moisture in the form of rain or snowfall onto the range (orographic lift). This climate supports the Palisade Glacier below the west slope. Precipitation runoff from this mountain drains into Big Pine Creek.

Gallery

See also
 
 List of the major 4000-meter summits of California

References

External links
 Weather forecast: Mount Gayley
 Mt. Gayley Rock Climbing: Mountainproject.com
 Mt. Gayley: Mountain-Forecast.com

Inyo National Forest
Mountains of Inyo County, California
Mountains of the John Muir Wilderness
North American 4000 m summits
Mountains of Northern California
Sierra Nevada (United States)